The  is a  railway line in Aichi Prefecture, Japan, operated by the private railway operator Nagoya Railroad (Meitetsu), connecting Kamiiida Station in Nagoya with Inuyama Station in Inuyama. The track from Kamiiida to Ajima is mostly underground, a continuation of the Kamiiida Line operated by the Nagoya Municipal Subway.

Stations

History

The line was opened in 1931, with the Kamiiida to Komaki section electrified at 600 V DC in 1942, and the section to Inuyama electrified in 1947.

CTC signalling was commissioned on the  section between Komaki and Buzan (since closed) in 1954, being the first use of this system by Meitetsu, and the voltage was increased to 1,500 V DC in 1964.

The line was double-tracked in staged between 1977 and 2003.

Former connecting lines
 Ajima Station: A  line to Shin-Katsukawa operated between 1931 and 1937.
 Buzan Station (since closed): A line to service the Komaki airfield opened in 1944. Closing date is not known. Prior to the construction of the Chūbu Centrair International Airport (serviced by the Meitetsu Airport Line), it had been proposed to upgrade the Komaki airfield to become the Nagoya International Airport, with a connecting line from Ajiyoshi station.
 Komaki Station: A  line electrified at 600 V DC to Iwakura on the Inuyama line opened in 1920. The voltage on the line was increased to 1,500 V DC in 1955, and the line closed in 1964. In 1945 construction began on a  loop line to Ajima (utilising the closed Shin-Katsukawa line mentioned above) to service an army arsenal and cadet school. The roadbed was about 50% complete when work was abandoned due to the end of the war.

See also
 List of railway lines in Japan

References
This article incorporates material from the corresponding article in the Japanese Wikipedia.

External links 

 Meitetsu official website 
 Meitetsu official website 

Komaki Line
Rail transport in Aichi Prefecture
1067 mm gauge railways in Japan